Lalagatti is a village in Dharwad district of Karnataka, India.

Demographics 
As of the 2011 Census of India there were 87 households in Lalagatti and a total population of 481 consisting of 253 males and 228 females. There were 67 children ages 0-6.

References

Villages in Dharwad district